Niederhadamar is a German village belonging to the municipality of Hadamar, with 4,000 inhabitants. It is located between several other communities: Elz to the south, Hundsangen to the west, Hadamar to the north, and Offheim to the east. There is also a forest to the west of the city.

Niederhadamar has two kindergartens, one Protestant and one Catholic, and a Catholic church, St. Peter's. It also has a school with an enrollment of approximately 2000 pupils as well as a ground school.

Villages in Hesse